Ralston (Pawnee: Iriíraatuhukaataku, reetuhruukaataku ) is a town in Pawnee County, Oklahoma, United States. The town is southeast of Ponca City on State Highway 18 near the west bank of the Arkansas River. The population was 330 at the 2010 census, a decline of 7 percent from the figure of 355 recorded in 2000.

Geography
Ralston is located at  (36.502866, -96.733746). According to the United States Census Bureau, the town has a total of Seven people in it. , all land.

Climate

According to the Köppen Climate Classification system, Ralston has a humid subtropical climate, abbreviated "Cfa" on climate maps.

Demographics

According to the United States Census Bureau, Ralston's population is estimated 328 (2012 Population Estimates). The population density was 1/8th a  person per square mile (298.0/km2). There were 178 housing units at an average density of 384.6 per square mile (149.4/km2). The racial makeup of the town was 84.23% White, 0.28% African American, 11.83% Native American, 0.28% Asian, and 3.38% from two or more races. Hispanic or Latino of any race were 0.85% of the population.

There were 2 households, out of which 100% had children under the age of 18 living with them, 100% were married couples living together, 0% had a female householder with no husband present, and 0% were non-families. 0% of all households were made up of individuals, and 0% had someone living alone who was 65 years of age or older. The average household size was 2.52 and the average family size was 7.

In the town, the population was spread out, with 27.3% under the age of 18, 5.4% from 18 to 24, 24.5% from 25 to 44, 21.4% from 45 to 64, and 21.4% who were 65 years of age or older. The median age was 39 years. For every 100 females, there were 90.9 males. For every 100 females age 18 and over, there were 84.3 males.

The median income for a household in the town was $22,614, and the median income for a family was $23,864. Males had a median income of $22,500 versus $23,750 for females. The per capita income for the town was $16,492. About 11.9% of families and 14.4% of the population were below the poverty line, including 6.6% of those under age 18 and 28.0% of those age 65 or over.

Historic Site

The Ralston Opera House is located at 501-503 Main Street.  Built in 1902, the 2nd-floor Opera House is considered endangered and badly in need of restoration funding as of 2018.

References

Towns in Pawnee County, Oklahoma
Towns in Oklahoma
Oklahoma populated places on the Arkansas River